Dean Farnham is a former Australian rules footballer, who played for the Central District Football Club in the South Australian National Football League (SANFL) and the Fitzroy Football Club in the Victorian Football League (VFL).

References

External links

1950 births
Living people
Australian rules footballers from South Australia
Central District Football Club players
Fitzroy Football Club players